Panone (in bolognese dialect panón, literally "big bread") is a traditional Christmas cake of the Bologna district of the Emilia Romagna regions of Italy, in particular the town of Molinella (Panone di Molinella). 

It consists of a dense sweet bread filled with many ingredients including cocoa, candied fruit, and sultanas. It is traditionally produced in square or rectangular loaves during the Christmas period.

References

See also 
 Christmas cake
Pandoro
Pannetone

Chocolate desserts
Cuisine of Emilia-Romagna